Suneel Puranik also known as Sunil Puranik is an Indian film and tele-serial actor, director and producer who predominantly working in the Kannada Film and Television Industry. He is the present chairman of Karnataka Chalanachitra Academy.

Early life
Suneel was born and brought up in Dharwad. He attended Junior Technical School, Hubli and Karnataka High School, Dharwad, obtained Diploma in Mechanical Engineering from K.H.K Institute, Dharwad and pursued professional training in film making from Adarsha Film Institute. Suneel married Suhasini in 1991 and has two sons Sagar Puranik (born 1992), and Sameer Puranik (born 2000).

Career
Suneel started his career in film industry as an actor in tele-serial. His first project was Venkataswami Pranaya Prasangagalu directed by M. S. Sathyu. Thereafter he assisted V. Somashekhar in directing movie named Ranaranga and Parashuram. Chirasmarane a Kannada TV serial about freedom fighters from Karnataka such as, Mundaragi Bhimarao, Naragunda Babasaheb, Surapura Venkatappa Nayaka, Sangolli Rayanna, Kitturu Chennamma, etc telecasted by Doordarshan was directed by him 1997. In 2010, he made his directorial debuts with film ‘Gurukula’ about the Gurukula, an education system of our ancient India which won Best Children’s Movie Award State Award in 2009-2010. He has held positions in the Kannada Film and Television Industry such as Member, Karnataka Chalanachitra Academy, Member, Karnataka Chalanachitra Nirdeshakara Sangha, Member, and Karnataka Chalanachitra Prashasti Samithi. Suneel Puranik was an honorary Member in the Jury of National Film Awards, 2016 and was a member of jury in the International Film Festival of India (IFFI) in 2018.

Filmography

TV Series
As Actor

As director

Accolades
Suneel has been awarded numerous accolades for his work. The most important ones are:
Kempegowda Award in 2009
Karnataka Rajyothsava Award (2009) by Government of Karnataka
Aryabhata Award
Best Children Film Awardee for his directorial film ‘Gurukula’.
Chitra Rasikara Prashasti for his role in the tele-serial Sangolli Rayanna.
Act Television award
Indira Priyadarshini Award
‘Communicator of the Year’, Award from Public Relations Counsel of India.

References

External links
 
 

1965 births
Living people
Indian film producers
Kannada male actors
Film producers from Karnataka
Male actors in Kannada television
Male actors from Bangalore
Male actors in Kannada cinema
Indian male film actors
Indian male television actors
Kannada film directors